Andres Lipstok (born 6 February 1957 in Haapsalu, Estonia) was the chairman of the Bank of Estonia from 7 June 2005 to 7 June 2012.  He has been a member of the Eesti Reformierakond (Estonian Reform Party) since 1994 and also the Vice President of the Estonian Olympic Committee 2004–2008.

Career history
2005–2012 Chairman of the Bank of Estonia
2003–2005 Member of the X Riigikogu
1999–2003 Member of the IX Riigikogu
1995–1999 Member of the VIII Riigikogu
1995–1996 Minister of Economic Affairs of the Republic of Estonia
1994–1995 Minister of Finance of the Republic of Estonia
1989–1994 County Governor of Lääne County
1989 Deputy Minister of Finance of the Estonian SSR
1986–1989 Chairman of the Planning Commission of the Executive Committee of Haapsalu District
1983–1986 Head of the Finance Department of the Executive Committee of Haapsalu District
1980–1983 Deputy Head of the Finance Department of the Executive Committee of Haapsalu District

References

1957 births
People from Haapsalu
Living people
Finance ministers of Estonia
Chairmen of the Bank of Estonia
Estonian Reform Party politicians
Recipients of the Order of the National Coat of Arms, 2nd Class
Recipients of the Order of the National Coat of Arms, 4th Class
Members of the Riigikogu, 1995–1999
Members of the Riigikogu, 1999–2003
Members of the Riigikogu, 2003–2007
Estonian referees and umpires
21st-century Estonian politicians
University of Tartu alumni